Cheshmeh Sheykh (also Romanized as Chashmeh Sheykh; also known as Chasmeh Sheykh) is a village in Dorunak Rural District, Zeydun District, Behbahan County, Khuzestan Province, Iran. At the 2006 census, its population was 162, in 34 families.

References 

Populated places in Behbahan County